Bernhard von Prittwitz (also Bernardus Pretwitz , Pret (t) ficz ; * around 1500 in Silesia; † 1561 in Trembowla ) was a Silesian officer in the service of the Polish Crown from the noble family those of Prittwitz. He was the squire and Starost of Ulanów (today ), Bar (1540-1552) and Trembowla (1552-1561, today Terebovlia).

Prittwitz was at that time Polish national hero and received after his military successes two honor names, which held themselves over generations: Bartłomiej Paprocki (1540-1614), the founder of the Polish heraldry, designated him in 1575 as "Terror Tartarorum", the "Terror of the Tartars" and "Krzysztof Warszewicki" (Varsevitius, 1543-1603) called him 'Murus Podoliae' in 1598, the Wall of Podolia in order to successfully fight against the many raids of the Islamic Crimean Tatars and Nogai Tatars, those who settled in Budjak, Yedisan and Dobruja.

Family 
Prittwitz was the son of the landowner Peter von Prittwitz , gentleman on the estates Gaffron, Rippin, Mangschütz and Kraschen (region Groß Wartenberg), Stronn (region Oels), as well as Haideberg and Myslniów (region Schildberg), and the Ludmila of Stwolinsky.

The Russian General of the Cavalry, Carl Baron von Prittwitz later said that he had repeatedly heard the rumor during his long stay in Poland, and especially in Warsaw, Bernhard's father Peter was already voivode of Podolia and had a love affair with Queen Bona Sforza, the wife of King Sigismund I of Poland. This should probably justify the personal benefits of Bernhard by Queen Bona (see below). But there were countless rumors about the foreign queen.

Details about his first wife are unknown. From this marriage he had a son Albert. In his second marriage in 1551 he was married to Barbara Zawadzka, also known as Branczlikowna, with whom he had son Jakob and a daughter. 'Jakob' 'later became Voivode. This 'Prittwitz' family living in Poland died out very soon.

Life

Polish Captain (until 1540) 

Prittwitz probably came from Silesia to Poland at a young age and entered the service of the Polish King Sigismund I, who before his accession Duke of Glogau and Opole, as well as royally- Bohemian governor of his elder brother, the King Vladislav of Bohemia and Hungary had been in Silesia. Both may have known each other from that time. Perhaps also because his father Peter had already been in Polish military service, since he owned two goods in Poland. In any case, son Bernhard is already mentioned in 1526 as a man at the Polish royal court. Later he also served as his successor Sigismund II of Poland.

In 1537, Prittwitz is called a royal Captain and commander a flock of 120 horsemen. But probably since 1530 he provided his service in the border area to the "Tatar Empire". At that time, all the enemies of Christianity s and all non-Christian peoples of the Orient were called Tartars, predominantly the Turks. The city of Bar as well as the neighboring towns of Trembowla and Ulanów had been invaded by Tartars in earlier times.

By 1538 Prittwitz must have already achieved first great merit in the fight against the Tartars and thus also the favor of Queen Bona Sforza, an Italian, because the Queen finally obtained the king, that contrary to the prevailing opinion of the "foreigner" Prittwitz im In 1538, the large estates around Koniacyn, in present-day Vinnytsia Oblast, were donated. But after all, Prittwitz's successes meant that he had to report in 1538/1539 even before the Polish Reichstag report. Also in 1539 Queen Bona provided for further benefits: It was left to Prittwitz city and Scharawka Castle (55 km northwest of Bar) with all its goods for lifelong use, from 1550 as property.

Starost of Ulanów, Bar and Trembowla (from 1540) 
Finally, in 1540, Queen Bona entrusted him with the office of Starost of Bar, whose district belonged to her own.
As a starost in the confines of Poland, Bernard Pretwicz's main mission was to protect Podolia from Tatar expeditions that devastated the region every year. With the income of the starosty, he managed to maintain a regular troupe to defend the province against the Tatar attacks. The resources of the starosty being insufficient, it engaged many Cossacks who often paid themselves by plundering the lands of the sultan, sometimes supplying them weapons and clothes. The pay of a Cossack was in any case half as high as that of a horse archer. The other starosts of the confines Fyodor Sanguszko, starost of Bratslav and Vinnytsia on the Southern Bug, and Dmytro Vyshnevetsky, staroste of Kaniv and Cherkasy on the Dnieper did the same.

At that time, only Polish noblemen were appointed to a "Starost" (Polish district administrator), which became - with the royal goods lying in this district - mostly hereditary - feud. Both in peace and in wartime, the Starost was the district captain, so in addition to his post as head of administration at the same time military Commander in Chief. So the appointment of a "foreigner" like Prittwitz to the Starost was an extraordinary honor. 

Prittwitz became "the man of providence for the Podolian lands" (source: Pulaski ): The small fortress bar offered shelter and food for only 30 men. Therefore, Prittwitz gradually built up a new type of defense system. From Cheremissen and Cossacks he formed his own troop of about 300 men, which he housed in smaller, well-mounted groups in castle-like fortifications in villages in the area. In the border areas he also positioned spies. For the first time Prittwitz made it impossible for the Tartars to unexpectedly invade Polish settlements in the Bar district. Because of the new "warning system" it was now possible to concentrate the "flying border protection" within a very short time at the endangered spot. Also new was that the enemy was even attacked and persecuted until it was wiped out, trapped or killed. Prittwitz is said to have won more than 70 battles with the Tatars over the years. His defense system and his fighting technique were therefore taken over by all Cossacks. Thus, the Silesian Prittwitz became one of the first great Cossack leaders.
Prittwitz became "the man of providence for the Podolian lands" (source: Pulaski ): The small fortress bar offered shelter and food for only 30 men. Therefore, Prittwitz gradually built up a new type of defense system. From Cheremissen and Cossacks he formed his own troop of about 300 men, which he housed in smaller, well-mounted groups in castle-like fortifications in villages in the area. In the border areas he also positioned spies. For the first time Prittwitz made it impossible for the Tartars to unexpectedly invade Polish settlements in the Bar district. Because of the new "warning system" it was now possible to concentrate the "flying border protection" within a very short time at the endangered spot. Also new was that the enemy was even attacked and persecuted until it was wiped out, trapped or killed. Prittwitz is said to have won more than 70 battles with the Tatars over the years. His defense system and his fighting technique were therefore taken over by all Cossacks. Thus, the Silesian Prittwitz became one of the first great Cossack leaders.

In March 1540, the Tatars had advanced to the city of Vinnytsia in northern Podolia. Prittwitz confronted them with a small group of Cossacks, drove them about 100 km to Ochakiv in the Jedisan, at that time one of the most important permanent places of the Ottoman Empire on the Black Sea, took away their rich prey and returned with Tatar women and children as prisoners. In 1541, Prittwitz invaded the Tartar territories again and pushed forward to Belgrad in the Budschak. In 1550, the Tartars, this time together with the Wallachians, re-entered the Polish Podolia and besieged the fortress bar, well equipped with weapons, with at least 56 large and 1,120 small barracks. Prittwitz resisted this time not only the siege and the attacks back, but brought the Tartars by their own breakout a great defeat.

Later, when King Sigismund II August, out of political calculations, prohibited him from retaliating against the Tartars, Prittwitz instead provided better border and city fortifications within his area of responsibility. These safeguards were a prerequisite for the beginning of peaceful settlement. Thus, under the protection of the "glorious starost" Prittwitz, the entire region of Bar and Vinnytsia was populated, trade and agriculture began to flourish.

During his tenure, not a single village in the Bar district has been cremated by Tatars. The fact is that many villages, towns and castles in Podolia have been rebuilt during this period.

Silesian homeland 
In all years Prittwitz has never stopped his contact with his Silesian homeland and his own family in Silesia. For example, B is B. Correspondence known with Duke Albrecht I of Brandenburg-Ansbach (1551/1552), the Grand Master of the German Order or with the Brieger Duke George II (1554). Also, he had in his home the estate Stronn, which he shared in 1548 with his brother Balthasar.

Prittwitz had probably met Duke Albrecht of Prussia, whose mother Sophie was the sister of King Sigismund I, perhaps at the Polish court. Or as a young man he had already been in the Duke's service; After all, he was also known in Silesia as a reiter horseman leader. Prittwitz was very open to Protestantism - like the entire family, which became Protestant early on. Therefore, Prittwitz tried to promote 12,000 soldiers for Duke Albrecht in Poland in support of the Protestant struggle.

"Terror Tartarorum" 

Prittwitz's victorious battles against the Tatars, who after decades of suffering at the border finally made the population of Poland breathe a sigh of relief in the Tatar defense, had to attract a great deal of attention. He therefore enjoyed the greatest fame, greatest reverence and esteem even during his lifetime - especially among the Polish youth. For example, a grandson of Biecki, who served as King Sigismund I as a squire, explicitly asked for permission to learn equestrian service at Prittwitz. A legend also later reported: "Just as Osowski and Prittwitz told us that children who cried too much in the cradle were frightened by their names so that they would be silent." (Source: Johann Sinapius ).

Prittwitz died in Trembowla in 1561. But even after his death, the enemies are said to have fled at the mere sight of Polish hosts - in the belief that the "Terror Tartarorum" still command them. Many years later, Ukrainian Cossacks are said to have sung the "Tartar Terror" in their war songs. A Polish chronicler reported back in 1726 that Prittwitz still stood in high esteem 170 years after his death. And King John II Casimir Vasa is said to have set up a portrait of Prittwitz in his room.

For his military achievements also speaks that only two years after Prittwitz 'death King Sigismund II in Poland a standing army erected to meet the renewed destruction in the border provinces by the Tartars, and long after his death the rhyme "Za Pana Pretfica wolna od Tatar granica" (At Prittwitz times the border was free of Tatars) was very popular in Poland.

Prittwitz's gravestone once bore the inscription cited here in Latin:

  Wanderer, behold, how uncertain man's dwelling is; 
  I came from Silesia; 
  Podolia praises the deceased; 
  I taught the art of war to the army;
  I have cut down Tartars, Turks and Wallachians; 
  therefore I was dear to the great king of the Sarmatians, Sigismund I. 
  I have received honorary testimonies and am celebrated in my mouth; 
  now I will be covered by this little mound, 
  abandoned by all; 
  I have neither treasures, nor piety, nor my fate helped; 
  not even my warfare took advantage of me; 
  So if you are religious, I ask you not to forget the Prittwitz if you pass by here.

Commemoration 
 Street Bernarda Pretficza named after him in Wrocław.
 Street Bernard Pretwicz named after him in Vinnytsia.

See also 
 Family of Prittwitz

References

Literature 
 Hans-Georg von Prittwitz: Bernhard Prittwitz from the House of Gaffron (Terror Tartarorum). Selbstverlag, Flensburg 1961.
 Robert von Prittwitz and Gaffron: The v. Prittwitz'sche nobility sex. Publisher Wilh. Gottl. Korn, Wroclaw 1870, page 57f.
 Genealogical Handbook of the Nobility, Noble Houses A Volume VI, Volume 29 of the Complete Series, C. A. Strong Publisher, Limburg (Lahn) 1962, p. 310

16th-century births
1561 deaths
Polish military personnel